Knize may refer to:

 Kníže (title), equivalent of "duke" or "prince", used in medieval Slavic countries such as Bohemia
 Kniže & Comp., the Viennese clothing store named after a Czech surname
 Josef Kniže (d. 1880), Czech tailor who founded Kniže & Comp.
 Frederic Wolff-Knize (1890–1949), Austrian businessman and art collector
 Petr Kníže, Czech martial artist